Samuel James Burlock (March 25, 1876 – August 18, 1941) was a Canadian politician. He served in the Legislative Assembly of New Brunswick from 1921 to 1925 as member of the United Farmers. He died in 1941.

References 

1876 births
1941 deaths